Thales Procopio Castro de Paula (born 29 June 2001), commonly known as Thales Paula, is a Brazilian footballer who plays as a winger for  club Nagoya Grampus.

Career
Thales began with Paraná Soccer Technical Center as youth career and move to Japan when became Shugakukan High School.

On 22 December 2020, he joined J3 club, Roasso Kumamoto with teammate Leo Kenta. On 2021, he officially signed with club. On 16 May 2021, he debuted play with J. League in second half against Nagano Parceiro in Matchweek 8. On 11 July 2021, he scored first goal in J. League against Iwate Grulla Morioka in Matchweek 15.

On 6 January 2022, he signed to J1 club Nagoya Grampus, although he was loaned straight back to Kumamoto for the 2022 season.

In November 2022, Thales returned to Nagoya Grampus.

Career statistics

Club
.

Notes

Honours
 Roasso Kumamoto
 J3 League : 2021

References

2001 births
Living people
Brazilian footballers
Brazilian expatriate footballers
Association football midfielders
J2 League players
J3 League players
Paraná Soccer Technical Center players
Roasso Kumamoto players
Brazilian expatriate sportspeople in Japan
Expatriate footballers in Japan